Siti Saleha Mohd Baharum (born 14 March 1990) is a Malaysian actress and model.

Life and career
Siti Saleha was born to an English mother, Tracey Johnson, also known as Aishah Rahman and a Malay father, Mohd Baharum Abdul Rahman. She is the third child of four raised in Klang, Selangor. She is the younger sister of Bunkface vocalist, Sam (born Shamsul Annuar Mohd Baharum). She rose to fame playing the titular role of Nora Elena in the eponymous TV3 drama.

Personal life
Saleha announced her engagement to civil servant, Lutfi Azhar, at a private ceremony at her family's residence in Klang on 26 November 2016.

On 28 July 2017, Saleha married Ahmad Lutfi Azhar. Their wedding reception was held at TPC Bukit Kiara, Kuala Lumpur. On 17 January 2022, after four years of marriage, the couple divorced.

Filmography

Film

Television series

Telemovie

Television

Videography

References

External links

 

1990 births
Living people
Malaysian film actresses
Malaysian television actresses
People from Basildon
Malaysian people of British descent
Malaysian people of Malay descent
Malaysian Muslims
Malaysian people of English descent
British emigrants to Malaysia
British people of Malaysian descent
British people of Malay descent